Tingena chloritis is a species of moth in the family Oecophoridae. It is endemic to New Zealand and has been found in the South Island. Larvae of this species feed on leaf litter. The adults of this species are light flyers and are attracted to light.

Taxonomy 
This species was first described by Edward Meyrick in 1883 using a specimen he collected at Lake Wakatipu at 1000 ft in December and named Oecophora chloritis. Meyrick gave a more detailed description under this name in 1884. In 1915 Meyrick placed this species within the Borkhausenia genus. In 1926 Alfred Philpott was unable to study the genitalia of the male of this species as a result of no specimens being available in New Zealand collections. George Hudson discussed this species under the name B. chloritis in his 1928 publication The butterflies and moths of New Zealand. In 1988 J. S. Dugdale placed this species in the genus Tingena. The male lectotype is held at the Natural History Museum, London.

Description 
Meyrick originally described the species as follows:

Meyrick went into more detail in 1884 and described the species as follows:

Hudson stated that this species:

Distribution

This species is endemic to New Zealand. Other than the type locality of Lake Wakatipu this species has also been found in the Cass Basin, in Canterbury, .

Behaviour 
The adults of this species are on the wing in November and E. G. White regarded this species as a "light flyer". This species is attracted to light. The larvae of this species are leaf litter feeders.

References

Oecophoridae
Moths of New Zealand
Moths described in 1883
Endemic fauna of New Zealand
Taxa named by Edward Meyrick
Endemic moths of New Zealand